Dr. Lecter is the debut studio album by the American rapper Action Bronson. It was released on March 15, 2011. The album's title refers to Dr. Hannibal Lecter, a character in the psychological-thriller film The Silence of the Lambs. The album is entirely produced by Tommy Mas. Almost all of the beats on Dr. Lecter were made with breakbeat samples. After hearing this album, the producer Statik Selektah collaborated with Bronson on an album titled Well Done, released on November 22, 2011.

Track listing 
*All songs produced by Tommy Mas.

References

2011 albums
Action Bronson albums